Ground spiders comprise Gnaphosidae, the seventh largest spider family with over 2,000 described species in over 100 genera distributed worldwide. There are 105 species known to central Europe, and common genera include Gnaphosa, Drassodes, Micaria, Cesonia, Zelotes and many others. They are closely related to Clubionidae. At present, no ground spiders are known to be seriously venomous to humans.

Description
Generally, ground spiders are characterized by having barrel-shaped anterior spinnerets that are one spinneret diameter apart. The main exception to this rule is found in the ant-mimicking genus Micaria. Another characteristic is an indentation in the endites (paired mouthparts anterior and lateral to the labium, or lip). All ground spiders lack a prey-capture web and generally run prey down on the surface. They hunt at night and spend the day in a silken retreat. The genitalia are diverse and are a good model for studying the evolution of genitalia because of their peculiar copulatory mechanism. The thick-walled egg sacs are guarded by the mother until the spiderlings hatch.

Hunting behavior
Ground spiders hunt by active foraging, chasing down and subduing individual prey items. They are adapted to hunting large and potentially dangerous prey, including other spiders, which they subdue by using their silk. When hunting, ground spiders produce thick, gluey silk from their enlarged spinnerets and attempt to use it to entangle their prey in swathing attacks, often applying their webbing to their prey's legs and mouths. By immobilizing potential prey in this manner, ground spiders can subdue proportionally large creatures while reducing risk of injury to themselves from their prey's attempts to fight back.

Genera

, the World Spider Catalog accepts the following genera:

Allomicythus Ono, 2009 — Vietnam
Allozelotes Yin & Peng, 1998 — China
Almafuerte Grismado & Carrión, 2017 — Bolivia, Argentina, Uruguay
Amazoromus Brescovit & Höfer, 1994 — Brazil
Ammoxenus Simon, 1893
Amusia Tullgren, 1910 — South Africa, East Africa
Anagraphis Simon, 1893 — Africa, Asia, Europe
Anagrina Berland, 1920 — Niger
Aneplasa Tucker, 1923 — South Africa, Angola
Anzacia Dalmas, 1919 — Australia, New Zealand, Papua New Guinea
Aphantaulax Simon, 1878 — Asia, Africa, Australia, France
Apodrassodes Vellard, 1924 — South America, Mexico, India
Apodrassus Chamberlin, 1916 — Peru
Aponetius Kamura, 2020 —  Ryukyu Is.
Apopyllus Platnick & Shadab, 1984 — South America, Mexico
Arauchemus Ott & Brescovit, 2012 — Brazil
Asemesthes Simon, 1887 — Africa
Asiabadus Roewer, 1961 — Afghanistan
Australoechemus Schmidt & Piepho, 1994 — Cape Verde Is.
Austrammo Platnick, 2002
Avstroneulanda Zakharov & Ovtsharenko, 2022
Barrowammo Platnick, 2002
Benoitodes Platnick, 1993 — St. Helena
Berinda Roewer, 1928 — Greece, Turkey, Cyprus
Berlandina Dalmas, 1922 — Asia, Africa, Europe
Cabanadrassus Mello-Leitão, 1941 — Argentina
Callilepis Westring, 1874 — Asia, North America, Europe
Callipelis Zamani & Marusik, 2017 — Iran
Camillina Berland, 1919 — Asia, Central America, South America, Africa, North America, Italy, Caribbean
Canariognapha Wunderlich, 2011 — Canary Is.
Ceryerda Simon, 1909 — Australia
Cesonia Simon, 1893 — Greece, Turkey, North America, Central America, Caribbean
Chatzakia Lissner & Bosmans, 2016 — Spain
Civizelotes Senglet, 2012 — Asia, Morocco, Europe
Cladothela Kishida, 1928 — Japan, China, Korea
Coillina Yin & Peng, 1998 — China
Coreodrassus Paik, 1984 — Asia
Cryptodrassus Miller, 1943 — Europe, Asia
Cryptoerithus Rainbow, 1915 — Australia
Cubanopyllus Alayón & Platnick, 1993 — Cuba
Diaphractus Purcell, 1907 — South Africa, Namibia
Drassodes Westring, 1851 — Africa, South America, Asia, Europe, North America
Drassodex Murphy, 2007 — Spain, France, Switzerland
Drassyllus Chamberlin, 1922 — North America, Asia, Europe
Echemella Strand, 1906 — Congo, Ethiopia
Echemographis Caporiacco, 1955 — Venezuela
Echemoides Mello-Leitão, 1938 — South America
Echemus Simon, 1878 — Sweden, Asia, Australia, Africa, Brazil
Eilica Keyserling, 1891 — Australia, South America, United States, Central America, Caribbean, Africa, India
Encoptarthria Main, 1954 — Australia
Epicharitus Rainbow, 1916 — Australia
Fedotovia Charitonov, 1946 — Mongolia, Iran, Afghanistan
Gaviphosa Sankaran, 2021 — India
Gertschosa Platnick & Shadab, 1981 — North America, Panama, Jamaica
Gnaphosa Latreille, 1804 — Asia, Europe, Africa, North America, Guatemala, Cuba
Haplodrassus Chamberlin, 1922 — Europe, Asia, North America, Africa
Herpyllus Hentz, 1832 — Argentina, North America, Asia
Heser Tuneva, 2004 — Asia, Spain, Africa, North America
Hitobia Kamura, 1992 — Asia
Homoeothele Simon, 1908 — Australia
Hongkongia Song & Zhu, 1998 — Indonesia, China, Hong Kong
Hypodrassodes Dalmas, 1919 — New Zealand, Australia
Ibala Fitzpatrick, 2009 — Africa
Intruda Forster, 1979 — Australia, New Zealand
Iranotricha Zamani & Marusik, 2018 — Iran
Kaitawa Forster, 1979 — New Zealand
Kikongo Rodrigues & Rheims, 2020 — D.R. Congo, Kenya
Kishidaia Yaginuma, 1960 — Asia, Italy
Kituba Rodrigues & Rheims, 2020 — D.R. Congo
Ladissa Simon, 1907 — Sierra Leone, India, Benin
Laronius Platnick & Deeleman-Reinhold, 2001 — Thailand, Indonesia
Lasophorus Chatzaki, 2018 — Greece
Latica da Silva, Guerrero, Bidegaray-Batista & Simó, 2020 — Uruguay, Argentina
Latonigena Simon, 1893 — South America
Leptodrassex Murphy, 2007 — Africa, Europe, Asia
Leptodrassus Simon, 1878 — Europe, Asia, Africa, Mexico
Leptopilos Levy, 2009 — Greece, Asia, Libya
Litopyllus Chamberlin, 1922 — United States, Cuba, Mexico
Macarophaeus Wunderlich, 2011 — Canary Is., Madeira
Marinarozelotes Ponomarev, 2020 — Asia, Europe, Africa, North America, South America
Marjanus Chatzaki, 2018
Matua Forster, 1979 — New Zealand
Megamyrmaekion Reuss, 1834 — Africa, Asia, Australia
Micaria Westring, 1851 — Asia, North America, Africa, Europe, Australia
Microdrassus Dalmas, 1919 — Seychelles
Microsa Platnick & Shadab, 1977 — Cuba
Micythus Thorell, 1897 — Thailand, Myanmar, Indonesia
Minosia Dalmas, 1921 — Africa, Asia, Europe
Minosiella Dalmas, 1921 — Asia, Africa
Molycria Simon, 1887 — Australia
Montebello Hogg, 1914 — Australia
Myandra Simon, 1887 — Australia
Nauhea Forster, 1979 — New Zealand
Neodrassex Ott, 2012 — Brazil, Argentina
Nodocion Chamberlin, 1922 — North America, India
Nomindra Platnick & Baehr, 2006 — Australia
Nomisia Dalmas, 1921 — Asia, Africa, Europe
Notiodrassus Bryant, 1935 — New Zealand
Odontodrassus Jézéquel, 1965 — Africa, Asia, Jamaica
Orodrassus Chamberlin, 1922 — United States, Canada
Parabonna Mello-Leitão, 1947 — Brazil
Parasyrisca Schenkel, 1963 — Europe, Asia, North America
Phaeocedus Simon, 1893 — Asia, Europe
Poecilochroa Westring, 1874 — Asia, Africa, South America, Europe
Pseudodrassus Caporiacco, 1935 — China, Libya, Turkey
Pterotricha Kulczyński, 1903 — Africa, Asia, Europe
Pterotrichina Dalmas, 1921 — Algeria
Rastellus Platnick & Griffin, 1990
Sanitubius Kamura, 2001 — China, Korea, Japan
Scopoides Platnick, 1989 — North America, Asia
Scotocesonia Caporiacco, 1947 — Guyana
Scotognapha Dalmas, 1920 — Canary Islands
Scotophaeus Simon, 1893 — Europe, Africa, Asia, South America, New Zealand
Sergiolus Simon, 1892 — North America, Caribbean, Asia
Sernokorba Kamura, 1992 — Asia, Europe
Setaphis Simon, 1893 — Spain, Africa, Asia
Shaitan Kovblyuk, Kastrygina & Marusik, 2013
Shiragaia Paik, 1992 — Korea
Sidydrassus Esyunin & Tuneva, 2002 — Asia
Smionia Dalmas, 1920 — South Africa
Solitudes Lin & Li, 2020 — China
Sosticus Chamberlin, 1922 — North America, Asia
Symphanodes Rainbow, 1916 — Australia
Synaphosus Platnick & Shadab, 1980 — Asia, Africa, North America, Greece
Talanites Simon, 1893 — Asia, North America, Ukraine
Talanitoides Levy, 2009 — Israel
Titus O. Pickard-Cambridge, 1901 — Zimbabwe
Trachyzelotes Lohmander, 1944 — Europe, Asia, North America, Africa, South America, Samoa
Trephopoda Tucker, 1923 — South Africa, Namibia
Trichothyse Tucker, 1923 — South Africa, Namibia
Turkozelotes Kovblyuk & Seyyar, 2009 — Greece, Asia
Urozelotes Mello-Leitão, 1938 — Zambia, Europe, Asia
Verita Ramírez & Grismado, 2016 — Argentina
Wesmaldra Platnick & Baehr, 2006 — Australia
Wydundra Platnick & Baehr, 2006 — Australia, Malaysia
Xerophaeus Purcell, 1907 — Africa, Yemen
Xizangiana Song, Zhu & Zhang, 2004 — China
Yoruba Rodrigues & Rheims, 2020 — Nigeria, Ivory Coast
Zagrotes Zamani, Chatzaki, Esyunin & Marusik, 2021 — Iran
Zelanda Özdikmen, 2009 — New Zealand
Zelominor Snazell & Murphy, 1997 — Portugal, Spain, Algeria
Zelotes Gistel, 1848 — Asia, North America, Europe, Africa, South America, Australia, Caribbean
Zelotibia Russell-Smith & Murphy, 2005 — Africa
Zelowan Murphy & Russell-Smith, 2010 — Congo, Burundi, Namibia
Zimiromus Banks, 1914 — Central America, South America, Caribbean, Mexico

Gallery

See also
 List of Gnaphosidae species

References

  (1983): A revision of the American spiders of the genus Zelotes (Araneae, Gnaphosidae). Bulletin of the AMNH 174: 99-191. PDF (29Mb) - Abstract

External links

Arachnology Home Pages: Araneae
Platnick, N.I. 2003. World Spider Catalog
 Pictures of Herpyllus ecclesiastus (free for noncommercial use)
 AMNH: Key to some genera
 A video of Sergiolus, a ground spider in Texas